Scott County is a county located in the southeastern portion of the U.S. state of Missouri. As of the 2020 census, the population was 38,059. Its county seat is Benton. The county was organized in 1821 and named for U.S. Representative John Scott, the first federal representative from Missouri. Scott County comprises the Sikeston, MO Micropolitan Statistical Area, which is also included in the Cape Girardeau-Sikeston, MO-IL Combined Statistical Area. The county is home to Scott County Central High School, which has won 18 state championships in boys basketball—the most of any high school in the state.

History
This area along the Mississippi River was long occupied by indigenous peoples. In historic times, the large and powerful Osage people dominated a large territory including this area and up and west from the later St. Louis, Missouri. Cape La Croix, a rock island in the Mississippi River, has a cross erected by Jesuit missionary Father De Montigny, who traveled with early French explorers in 1699. Some French colonists established trading relationships with the Osage; the traders were based in St. Louis, founded in the late 18th century.

Spain had taken control in 1763 after French lost to Britain in the Seven Years' War. They laid out the King's Highway (El Camino Real) in 1789, a north–south route crossing the county and extending through St. Louis, Missouri. In the late 1790s, Southerners were the first United States settlers on Spanish land grants in this area. France briefly took back the territory, then sold it to the United States in 1803 as part of the Louisiana Purchase.

Delaware (Lenape) and Shawnee people migrated into the area in the 1820s from territories east of the Mississippi, pushed by European-American encroachment on their lands.

The second county formed in Missouri's Southeast Lowland Region, Scott County was created by the Missouri state legislature on December 28, 1821. The county was named in honor of John Scott (1785–1861), the first congressman from Missouri.

One of the earliest settlements was Commerce, Missouri, long known as Tywapitty, derived from an Osage language term. It was an early French fur trading post. Under Spanish rule before 1800, Rezin Bowie was syndic of Tywappity Settlement. (He was the brother of Kentucky frontiersman Jim Bowie.) This was established as a river landing by 1803, and residents formed the first Baptist Church in Missouri there in 1805. Sergeant John Ordway of the Lewis and Clark expedition used the proceeds from his land grant bounty to purchase land in Tywapitty where he farmed cotton and had apple and peach orchards until devastated by the 1811-182 New Madrid earthquakes. The city was platted in 1823 and it served as the Scott county seat from 1864 to 1878.

The current county seat of Benton was laid out in 1822; it is named after Thomas Hart Benton, one of Missouri's first U.S. Senators.

New Hamburg, the third town founded in the county, was settled by a wave of German immigrants in the late 1840s, who came to this country after the German revolutions of 1848. The first log church was St. Lawrence Catholic Church. Sikeston, the largest city in the county and the fourth settlement to be founded, was settled in 1800 and was laid out in 1860 by John Sikes on the Cairo & Fulton Railroad.

The county was devastated by guerrilla raids during the U.S. Civil War. Afterward, it developed rapidly from the 1870s to the early 1900s; its dense forests were lumbered off and numerous railroads were constructed. Towns founded during this period included Diehlstadt, Morley, Oran, Perkins, Blodgett, Crowder, Vanduser, Illmo, Fornfelt (Scott City), Chaffee, Ancell, and Kelso. The Thebes-Mississippi River Railroad Bridge at Illmo was built in 1905.

Located near Morley is the gravesite of Nathaniel W. Watkins, a state legislator and a general in the Missouri State Guards. He was a half-brother of statesman Henry Clay. Wilson Brown, the ninth lieutenant governor of Missouri, lived in the county for a time. Noted early legislators such as Joseph Hunter II and Abraham Hunter also lived here.

Cotton, soybeans, melon and grains were all common crops in rural Scott County. Between the Mississippi River and Little River District drainage ditches lies one of the oldest drainage systems in the United States, Crowley's Ridge, established in 1905, is a remnant of an old coastal floodplain and natural levee that crosses the country.

On January 28, 2004, the Scott County Courthouse was added to the National Register of Historic Places.

Geography
The county's eastern border with Illinois is formed by the Mississippi River.

Adjacent counties
Cape Girardeau County (northwest)
Alexander County, Illinois (northeast)
Mississippi County (southeast)
New Madrid County (south)
Stoddard County (southwest)

Major highways
 Interstate 55
 Interstate 57
 U.S. Route 60
 U.S. Route 61
 U.S. Route 62
 Route 77

Demographics

As of the census of 2000, there were 40,422 people, 15,626 households, and 11,219 families residing in the county. The population density was 37/km2 (96/mi2). There were 16,951 housing units at an average density of 16/km2 (40/mi2). The racial makeup of the county was 87.68% White, 10.50% Black or African American, 0.28% Native American, 0.23% Asian, 0.01% Pacific Islander, 0.40% from other races, and 0.90% from two or more races. Approximately 1.11% of the population were Hispanic or Latino of any race.

There were 15,626 households, out of which 35.40% had children under the age of 18 living with them, 54.60% were married couples living together, 13.40% had a female householder with no husband present, and 28.20% were non-families. 25.00% of all households were made up of individuals, and 11.80% had someone living alone who was 65 years of age or older. The average household size was 2.55 and the average family size was 3.03.

In the county, the population was spread out, with 27.40% under the age of 18, 8.50% from 18 to 24, 27.50% from 25 to 44, 22.90% from 45 to 64, and 13.70% who were 65 years of age or older. The median age was 36 years. For every 100 females there were 91.60 males. For every 100 females age 18 and over, there were 86.40 males.

The median income for a household in the county was $39,735, and the median income for a family was $48,847. Males had a median income of $30,169 versus $19,269 for females. The per capita income for the county was $19,363. About 12.30% of families and 16.10% of the population were below the poverty line, including 23.50% of those under age 18 and 13.60% of those age 65 or over.

Religion
According to the Association of Religion Data Archives County Membership Report (2000), Scott County is a part of the Bible Belt with evangelical Protestantism being the majority religion. The most predominant denominations among residents in Scott County who adhere to a religion are Southern Baptists (40.54%), Roman Catholics (27.12%), and Methodists (9.28%).

2020 Census

Politics

Local
The Democratic Party has historically controlled politics at the local level in Scott County. In recent years, however, Republicans have made inroads, gaining control of several county offices in 2018 and 2020. Republicans now hold most elected positions in the county, while Democrats only control the offices of County Clerk, Collector, Commissioner (district 2), Coroner, Recorder, and Surveyor.

State
Scott County is divided into three legislative districts in the Missouri House of Representatives and one district in the Missouri Senate.

District 148 - Currently represented by Jamie Burger (R-Benton)

District 149 - Currently represented by Don Rone Jr. (R-Portageville)

District 151 - Currently represented by Herman Morse (R-Whitewater)

Federal
Scott County is included in Missouri's 8th Congressional District and is currently represented by Jason T. Smith (R-Salem) in the U.S. House of Representatives.

     7614

     7614

Political culture

At the presidential level, Scott County was historically a Democratic stronghold, voting Democratic in every election from 1872 through 1976 save Warren Harding's 1920 landslide and Richard Nixon's 1972 landslide. A shift began to become evident in the 1980s, as Scott County voted Republican thrice in a row for the first time, one of those times even being against Southerner Jimmy Carter; however, all three elections were nationally decisive Republican wins, and Bill Clinton was able to recapture the county, albeit not by large margins, in both of his wins. Since then, however, Scott County has transitioned to being a reliable Republican stronghold; as of 2020, it has voted Republican six times in a row, and the Republican vote share has not gone below 60% since 2000. Donald Trump exceeded three-quarters of the vote in both of his runs.

Like most rural areas throughout Southeast Missouri, voters in Scott County generally adhere to socially and culturally conservative principles. In 2004, Missourians voted on a constitutional amendment to define marriage as the union between a man and a woman—it overwhelmingly passed Scott County with 85.32 percent of the vote. The initiative passed the state with 71 percent of support from voters as Missouri became the first state to ban same-sex marriage. In 2006, Missourians voted on a constitutional amendment to fund and legalize embryonic stem cell research in the state—it failed in Scott County with 64.85 percent voting against the measure. The initiative narrowly passed the state with 51 percent of support from voters as Missouri became one of the first states in the nation to approve embryonic stem cell research. Despite Scott County's longstanding tradition of supporting socially conservative platforms, voters in the county have a penchant for advancing populist causes like increasing the minimum wage. In 2006, Missourians voted on a proposition (Proposition B) to increase the minimum wage in the state to $6.50 an hour—it passed Scott County with 67.99 percent of the vote. The proposition strongly passed every single county in Missouri with 75.94 percent voting in favor as the minimum wage was increased to $6.50 an hour in the state. During the same election, voters in five other states also strongly approved increases in the minimum wage.

Education
Of adults 25 years of age and older in Scott County, 72.9% possesses a high school diploma or higher while 10.6% holds a bachelor's degree or higher as their highest educational attainment.

Public schools
Chaffee R-II School District – Chaffee 
Chaffee Elementary School (K-06)
Chaffee Jr.-Sr. High School (07-12)
Oran R-III School District – Oran
Oran Elementary School (K-06)
Oran High School (07-12)
Scott County R-IV School District – Benton
Scott County Elementary School (K-05)
Scott County Middle School (06-08)
Thomas W. Kelly High School (09-12)
Scott City R-I School District – Scott City
Scott City Elementary School (K-04)
Scott City Middle School (05-08)
Scott City High School (09-12)
Scott County Central School District – Sikeston
Scott County Central Elementary School (PK-06)
Scott County Central High School (07-12)
Sikeston R-VI School District – Sikeston
Sikeston Kindergarten and Early Childhood Center (PK-K)
Lee Hunter Elementary (01-04)
Southeast Elementary (01-04)
Wing Elementary (01-04)
Sikeston 5th & 6th Grade Center (05-06)
Sikeston Jr. High School (07-08)
Sikeston Sr. High School (09-12)
Sikeston Alternative Education Center
Sikeston Career and Technology Center

Private schools
St. Denis School – Benton – (01-08) – Roman Catholic
St. Ambrose School – Chaffee – (K-08) – Roman Catholic
St. Augustine School – Kelso – (01-08) – Roman Catholic
Guardian Angel School – Oran – (K-08) – Roman Catholic
St. Joseph School – Scott City – (K-08) – Roman Catholic
St. Francis Xavier Christian Academy – Sikeston – (PK-08) – Roman Catholic
Southeast Missouri Christian Academy – Sikeston – (PK-K) Daycare Center – Non-denominational Christian
Solid Rock Christian Academy – Sikeston – Non-denominational Christian

Colleges and universities
Sikeston Area Higher Education Center (SAHEC) – Sikeston – A satellite campus of Southeast Missouri State University.
Sikeston Career & Technology Center – Sikeston – A technical school based out of the Sikeston R-VI School District. 
Three Rivers College (Missouri) | Three Rivers College – Sikeston

Public libraries
Chaffee Public Library  
Sikeston Public Library

Communities

Cities

Benton (county seat)
Cape Girardeau (mostly in Cape Girardeau County)
Chaffee
Miner (small part in Mississippi County)
Morley
Oran
Scott City (small part in Cape Girardeau County)
Sikeston (partly in New Madrid County)

Villages

Blodgett
Commerce
Diehlstadt
Haywood City
Kelso
Lambert
Vanduser

Unincorporated communities

Bleda
Browns
Crowder
Kagel
Lusk
McMullin
New Hamburg
Parker
Perkins
Porter
Rockview
Salcedo
Sargent
Tanner
Zewapeta

Former community
Illmo

See also
National Register of Historic Places listings in Scott County, Missouri

References

External links
ScottCountyMO.com
 Digitized 1930 Plat Book of Scott County  from University of Missouri Division of Special Collections, Archives, and Rare Books

 
Missouri counties on the Mississippi River
1821 establishments in Missouri
Populated places established in 1821